Lucrezia d'Este may refer to:

 (born ), daughter of Ercole I d'Este, Duke of Ferrara, married Annibale II Bentivoglio (1467–1540)
Lucrezia d'Este (daughter of Sigismondo) (before 1490 – after 1505), see Sigismondo d'Este (1433–1507) and Malaspina family
Lucrezia d'Este (1535–1598),  daughter of Ercole II d'Este, Duke of Ferrara